Bruemmerville is an unincorporated community in the town of Ahnapee, Kewaunee County, Wisconsin, United States. The community was named for Henry Bruemmer, who bought a grist mill on Silver Creek in 1866 and established a brick manufacturing plant.

References

Unincorporated communities in Kewaunee County, Wisconsin
Unincorporated communities in Wisconsin